The Colorado Community College System is a public community college system in the U.S. state of Colorado. Created by legislation in 1967, it has 13 member institutions and serves more than 163,000 students annually.

History 
The 1937 Junior College Reorganization Act laid the foundation for Colorado's existing junior colleges to flourish and local districts to start new junior colleges by providing for local district funding of junior colleges under Colorado's public school districts.

The Community College and Occupational Act of 1967 separated community colleges and vocational schools from sole local district control by establishing a State Board for Community Colleges and Occupational Education (SBCCOE) to share control of a new statewide system with local boards. The act was signed on May 27, and control of the functions, powers, and funds from the state board of education to the SBCCOE took effect on July 1, 1967.

Two Colorado state House Bills brought more change in the late 1980s. In 1985, House Bill 1187 established the SBCCOE as the system governing body, local boards change to advisory councils, oversight of the community college and vocational program merge and the Community College of Denver System was split into three separate community colleges. In 1986, House Bill 1237 abolished and recreated the SBCCOE into its current configuration and mandated that the SBCCOE and Colorado's four-year institutions develop a core academic program for community college students. In 1988, that curriculum was implemented and  guaranteed transfer agreements were signed with all Colorado four-year public colleges and universities.

The redevelopment of the former Lowry Air Force Base brought additional land and building space to the SBCCOE. The Lowry Campus offers classroom space and the permanent headquarters of the Colorado Community College System.

Governance
The system is governed by the eleven-member State Board for Community Colleges and Occupational Education (SBCCOE). The nine voting members of the board are appointed by the Governor and confirmed by the State Senate for staggered four-year terms. These nine appointed members are geographically and politically distributed, with one from each of the state's federal congressional districts, plus two at-large members, with no more than five members from any single political party. The two non-voting members are one faculty member and one student member, each selected via the faculty's and students' governance structures respectively.

Colleges

State community colleges 
There are 13 community colleges under direct governance of the SBCCOE, the System's chancellor, and the state system office.

Arapahoe Community College (Littleton, Castle Rock, Parker)
Colorado Community Colleges Online
Colorado Northwestern Community College (Rangely, Craig)
Community College of Aurora (Aurora, Denver)
Community College of Denver (Denver)
Front Range Community College (Westminster, Fort Collins, Longmont, Loveland, Brighton)
Lamar Community College (Lamar)
Morgan Community College (Fort Morgan, Burlington, Bennett, Wray, Limon)
Northeastern Junior College (Sterling)
Otero College (La Junta)
Pikes Peak State College (Colorado Springs)
Pueblo Community College (Pueblo, Durango)
Red Rocks Community College (Lakewood, Arvada)
Trinidad State College (Trinidad, Alamosa)

Local district community colleges 
There are two community colleges that are generally governed by local elected boards of trustees within the college's own special electoral district. These colleges are generally not considered a part of the "System" proper, though the SBCCOE has a role in governing the schools.

Aims Community College (Greeley, Loveland, Windsor, Fort Lupton)
Colorado Mountain College (Glenwood Springs, Leadville, Steamboat Springs, Edwards, Rifle, Aspen, Carbondale, Salida, Breckenridge, Dillon)

Area technical colleges
The state's three area technical colleges are generally governed by local school district boards of education. As with the local district community colleges, these are generally not considered a part of the "System" proper, though the SBCCOE has a role in governing the schools.

Emily Griffith Technical College (Denver)
Pickens Technical College (Aurora)
Technical College of the Rockies (Delta, Montrose)

University-affiliated community colleges
Western Colorado Community College (part of Colorado Mesa University)

See also
List of colleges and universities in Colorado
Wikimedia Commons: Universities and colleges in Colorado

Notes

References

External links 
Official website

 
Public education in Colorado
 C
Educational institutions established in 1967
1967 establishments in Colorado